Davide Mordini (born 3 August 1996) is an Italian footballer who plays as a defender for Olbia.

Club career
He made his Serie C debut for Santarcangelo on 7 September 2015 in a game against Arezzo.

On 3 August 2020 he signed a 2-year contract with Fermana. On 10 January 2022, he joined Teramo on loan.

In November 2022, Mordini signed for Olbia on a contract until June 2023.

References

External links
 

1996 births
Living people
People from Recanati
Footballers from Marche
Sportspeople from the Province of Macerata
Italian footballers
Association football defenders
Serie B players
Serie C players
Serie D players
A.C. Cesena players
Santarcangelo Calcio players
U.S.D. Recanatese 1923 players
A.C. Mestre players
FeralpiSalò players
Fermana F.C. players
S.S. Teramo Calcio players
Olbia Calcio 1905 players